Xesús Ferro Ruibal (Moraña, 1944)  is a theologian, Latinist and writer from Galicia.

He is a member of the Real Academia Galega and he helped translate the Bible to Galician. He works nowadays in a phraseology project of Centro Ramón Piñeiro para a Investigación en Humanidades, where he publishes his logs often.

Works
Dido e Eneas. Xénese, nacemento e vida de dous personaxes polémicos da Eneida, 1983
Refraneiro galego básico, 1987
A Igrexa e a lingua galega, 1988
Diccionario dos nomes galegos, 1992
 Xosé Chao Rego: renacer galego. (Actas do Simposio-Homenaxe), Fundación Bautista Álvarez de Estudos Nacionalistas, 2010.
 O libro da vaca. Monografía etnolingüística do gando vacún, Centro Ramón Piñeiro para a Investigación en Humanidades, 2010,  (with Pedro Benavente Jareño)

References

External links
 Website:Cadernos de Fraseoloxía

1944 births
Living people
Spanish male writers
Writers from Galicia (Spain)
Galician translators
Linguists of Galician
Translators of the Bible into Galician
Galician-language writers
Paremiologists
Proverb scholars